Kurdalægon, also spelled and known as Kuịrdalägon, Kurd-Alägon, Aläugon, Kurd-Alä-Uärgon, is the heavenly deity of blacksmiths in Ossetian mythology. His epithet is "the heavenly one"; he shoes the dead man's horse, thus helping him on his journey to the other side. He is a close friend of the Narts.

It is important to note that despite being associated with other blacksmith deities in different Indo-European mythologies (like Vulcan) he does not have the status of a god. Ossetian mythology is considered to be monotheistic, with only Xwytsau being considered God, and all the others (called zædtæ and dæwdžytæ) being considered deities of a lower class.

Etymology 
The whole phrase means "Alan/Aryan Blacksmith Wærgon". Kurd originates from *kur-ta- or *kur-tar-, which is agent noun of *kur- "to heat", "to incandesce". Ossetian alæ originates from arya-,  and originally meant "Aryan", and later "Alan".

The original name Wærgon is derived from Old Ossetic *wærg "wolf" (see Warg). The linguist Vasily Abaev compares it to the name of the Roman god Vulcan.

See also 
 Tlepsh
 Vulcan
 Kaveh the Blacksmith

References

Sources 
 Abaev, V.I. Historical-Etymological Dictionary of Ossetian language
 

European gods
Ossetian mythology
Smithing gods